Mobilink was the trade name of Pakistan Mobile Communications Limited (PMCL), a mobile operator in Pakistan providing a range of prepaid and postpaid voice and data telecommunication services to both individual and corporate subscribers. In 2017, Warid Pakistan merged with Mobilink to form Jazz, under which the company now operates. Mobilink's head office was in Islamabad, and its last president and CEO was Aamir Ibrahim, who became the CEO of Jazz. 

The network claims to have been the first GSM-based mobile operator in South Asia.

History 
Formerly known as Mobilink, the company was founded in 1994 as a joint venture between Saif Group and Motorola Inc. In February 2001, Egypt based Orascom Telecom Holding bought Motorola’s shares in Mobilink to become the majority shareholder with 69% control. Then in June 2007, Orascom further purchased the remaining shares under Saif Group’s control to become Mobilink’s 100% owner.

In 2010, Russian operator Vimpelcom (now VEON Ltd.) agreed to acquire most of the telecom assets of Orascom, including Mobilink, in a $6.5 billion deal, creating the world’s fifth-largest mobile network operator by subscriber base.

In November 2015, Vimpelcom announced the 100% acquisition of Pakistan’s Warid Telecom, a subsidiary of Abu Dhabi Group. Completed in July 2016 after due approvals, the first-ever local telecom company acquisition created a combined subscriber base of 50 million. Following this merger, Mobilink was officially rebranded to Jazz in 2017.

Radio Frequency Summary

In April 2014, Mobilink participated in the Next Generation Mobile Services (NGMS) auction held by Pakistan Telecommunication Authority (PTA), Mobilink won the bid for the 2100 MHz 3G license. In July 2014, they announced that their 3G network would be the country's largest with over 9000 3G-ready cell sites.

In November 2015, Mobilink announced its merger with Warid Pakistan, the merger was completed in July 2016 and the companies were going to plan for integration and merging into a single brand in the future. In November 2016, Mobilink announced that Warid customers would be able to use their 3G network, and Mobilink customers will be able to use Warid's LTE network.

Subsidiaries, joint ventures, and holdings 
Mobilink is a communications access provider offering customers access through different channels. The four key platforms Mobilink operates are:
 Mobile Phone Telephony
 Broadband access
 Internet
 Mobile Banking
Mobilink (PMCL) acquired and merged the different external or internal divisions managing each platform and now all operate under the different brands.

Jazz X (Haier Co-Branded) Mobile Phones 
Mobilink along with Haier Mobile division has launched co-branded handsets including feature phone, smartphones, and tablets.

Jazzcash 
Mobilink has partnered with Waseela Microfinance Bank to mark its entry into the branchless banking segment. With Mobicash, customers have access to the simplest way to conduct their financial transactions, related to paying bills, sending/receiving money within Pakistan, purchasing top-ups for their cell phones (Pre-paid).

LinkdotNet 
LINkdotNET (an Orascom Subsidiary) commenced its operation in Pakistan by acquiring two already existing Internet Service Providers (ISPs) named as World Online (WOL) Telecom Limited and Dancom Online. LINKdotNET merged the resources of these two companies and by putting in more investment launched its operations officially on 2 February 2008. It was offering its services in more than 130 cities in Pakistan and in two years this company raised its customer base up to 35,000. LINKdotNET provided services for both home and commercial users and was the second-largest broadband service provider in Pakistan after PTCL (Pakistan Telecommunication Limited).

Mobilink Infinity (WiMAX Division) 
Under the brand name of Infinity, Mobilink had started its WiMAX services in major cities of Pakistan.

Orascom took over the management 
Despite having the 66% of Mobilink GSM business share, in April 2001, Orascom (GTH) took over management control of the company. As the market leader, Mobilink serves approximately 38.1 million customers and has a 28% market share (as of March 31, 2014).

Orascom's acquisition of Mobilink 
On March 30, 2000, Mobilink was 66% acquired by Orascom Investment Holding. Orascom has mobile telephony holdings in a number of countries in Africa and the Middle East.

All About Mobilink-Jazz And Their Packages Information  
Mobilink / Jazz History: Mobilink / Jazz was a trademark of Pakistan. Mobile Communications Limited (PMCL). a Pakistani mobile phone company that provides. a variety of pre-paid voice and data communication services. To both individuals and corporate subscribers. Its headquarters are in Islamabad, with current President and CEO Aamir Ibrahim. The network claims to be the first GSM-based mobile operator in South Asia.

Blackberry

Governance

President and CEO 
 2016: Aamir Ibrahim
 2014: Jeffrey Hedberg
 2008: Sifat Ullah Hashir
 2003: Zouhair Abdul Khaliq
 1993: Jim Beneda

Board of Directors 
List of people in board of directors to whom Mobilink is governed.

Mobilink Foundation 
The  Mobilink Foundation is a registered non-profit organization, which provides support for the local community not only financially but also through dedicated volunteer hours. Being a philanthropic organization, it is purely based on employee volunteerism. No administrative costs or overheads are incurred age the organization and therefore, every single penny that is donated to Mobilink Foundation goes directly into making a difference on the ground.

Torchbearers 
The Mobilink Foundation Torchbearers clock an average of 4 to 5 dedicated hours per person per month during official working hours. On average the volunteers spent more than 4,500 hours in 2012 in community service initiatives.

Other Internet Free Services 
Mobilink also provides free services like access to Wikimedia Foundation's Wikipedia Zero.
Free Facebook is also available with no photos on Mobilink.

Merger with Warid 
Mobilink previously announced its merger with Warid Tel in November 2015. The case was under review at Pakistan telecommunication authority. After scrutiny PTA finally approved the merger on 24 May 2016. In January 2017, Mobilink CEO, Aamir Ibrahim, stated that the Warid brand name would be history, and both companies would be re-launched under the 'Jazz' brand name. After the acquisition of Warid now Mobilink joins the 4G service provider in Pakistan.

See also
 Jazz
 List of mobile phone companies in Pakistan

References 

Jazz (mobile network operator)
VEON
Pakistani subsidiaries of foreign companies
Defunct companies of Pakistan
2010 mergers and acquisitions